Tegar Infantrie Sukamto (born May 8, 1999), is an Indonesian professional footballer who plays as a midfielder for Liga 1 club Persikabo 1973.

Club career

PSIS Semarang
PSIS Semarang was his first professional club after playing with the junior team, he made his debut in a match against Persipon Pontianak replacing Muhamad Yunus.

RANS Cilegon
In 2021, Infantrie signed a contract with Indonesian Liga 2 club RANS Cilegon. He made his league debut on 28 September against Dewa United.

Persikabo 1973
Infantrie was signed for Persikabo 1973 to play in Liga 1 in the 2022–23 season. He made his league debut on 25 July 2022 in a match against Persebaya Surabaya at the Pakansari Stadium, Cibinong.

Career statistics

Club

Honours

Club
PSIS Semarang
 Liga 2 third place (play-offs): 2017

References

External links
 Tegar Infantrie at Soccerway
 Tegar Infantrie at Liga Indonesia

1999 births
Living people
Indonesian footballers
Association football forwards
Liga 2 (Indonesia) players
Liga 1 (Indonesia) players
PSIS Semarang players
RANS Nusantara F.C. players
Persikabo 1973 players
People from Semarang
Sportspeople from Central Java